Hans Noever (born 10 May 1928) is a German writer, film director, screenwriter and actor. He directed thirteen films between 1973 and 1986. His 1980 film Der Preis fürs Überleben was entered into the 30th Berlin International Film Festival.

Selected filmography
 The Smooth Career (dir. Haro Senft, 1967)
 Zahltag (1973)
  (1978)
 The Night with Chandler (1979)
 Der Preis fürs Überleben (1980)
 Total vereist (1981)
 Die Flügel der Nacht (1982)
  (1985)
 Lockwood Desert, Nevada (1986)
 Reporter (1989, TV series)
  (1993, TV miniseries)

References

External links

1928 births
Living people
Mass media people from North Rhine-Westphalia
German male film actors
People from Krefeld